Lo Mejor (Spanish "The Best") may refer to:

Lo Mejor (LeBron Brothers album), 1992
Lo Mejor (Grupo Niche album), 1998
Lo Mejor, a 2004 album by Johnny Pacheco
Lo Mejor de A. B. Quintanilla III y Los Kumbia Kings, a 2016 album
Lo mejor de Bosé, Miguel Bosé
Lo Mejor de Marcos, or several sequel albums by Marcos Witt
Lo Mejor de...Selena, a 2015 album by Selena

See also
Simplemente Lo Mejor, a 2008 album by Ricardo Arjona
Lo Mejor de Mí, a 1997 album by Cristian Castro
"Lo Mejor de Mí" (song), song written by Rudy Pérez and first recorded by Juan Ramon
The Best (disambiguation)